Katja Wienerroither (born 3 January 2002) is an Austrian footballer who plays as a forward for Grasshopper Club and the Austria women's national team.

Club career
Wienerroither has played for USC Eugendorf, FC Bergheim and Sturm Graz in Austria.

International career
Wienerroither made her senior debut for Austria on 6 March 2020.

References

2002 births
Living people
Austrian women's footballers
Women's association football forwards
SK Sturm Graz (women) players
ÖFB-Frauenliga players
Austria women's international footballers